Mornington is a suburb of the town of Mount Isa in the City of Mount Isa, Queensland, Australia. In the  Mornington had a population of 1,764 people.

Geography 
The Leichhard River flows north-south through the town of Mount Isa, dividing the suburbs of the town into "mineside" (west of the Leichhardt River) and "townside" (east of the Leichhardt River). Mornington is a "townside" suburb.

History
Mornington was named on 1 September 1973 by the Queensland Place Names Board. Originally a locality, it became a suburb on 16 March 2001.

Heritage listings 
Mornington has a number of heritage-listed sites, including:
 Camooweal Street: Underground Hospital
 Camooweal Street:  Tent House

Facilities 
Mount Isa Base Hospital is a public hospital at 30 Camooweal Street. It includes the Centre for Rural and Remote Health operated by James Cook University.

References

External links 
 

Suburbs of Mount Isa